Khatwan is a village and one of the 51 Union Councils (administrative subdivisions) of Khushab District in the Punjab Province of Pakistan. It is located at 31°45'44N 72° 3' 58E.

References

Union councils of Khushab District
Populated places in Khushab District